= Nela Live-Fire Restaurant =

Restaurant in Amsterdam and London

Nela is a restaurant brand founded in 2022 in Amsterdam by chefs Hariprasad Shetty and Ori Geller with entrepreneur Gilad Hayeem. The concept focuses on live-fire cooking and shared dining. In 2025 Nela expanded with a seasonal residency in Ibiza and a new restaurant at The Whiteley in London.

== History ==
Nela opened in October 2022 in the Valley complex on the Zuidas business district in Amsterdam. The founders described the concept as inspired by open-fire cooking traditions with a menu designed for sharing plates. The interior design was created by the studio Concrete Amsterdam.

== Reception ==
Reception in the Dutch press was mixed. Het Parool reviewed the opening positively, rating the restaurant 8.5 out of 10 and calling the dishes “extremely simple but never boring.” By contrast, de Volkskrant called the restaurant “heavenly boring” in a critical 2023 review. In the 2024–25 edition of Gault&Millau Netherlands, Nela received a score of 12 out of 20.

== Expansion ==
In summer 2025 Nela held a seasonal residency at the 7Pines Resort in Ibiza.

A second permanent location is scheduled to open in September 2025 at The Whiteley development in Bayswater, London.

== See also ==
- Hariprasad Shetty
- The Entourage Group
